George Yuri Rainich (Rabinovich) (March 25, 1886 in Odessa – October 10, 1968) was a leading mathematical physicist in the early twentieth century.

Career
Rainich studied mathematics from 1904 to 1908 in Odessa, in Göttingen (1905–1906), and in Munich (1906–1907), eventually obtaining his doctorate (Magister of Pure Mathematics) in 1913 from the University of Kazan. After teaching at the University of Kazan, in 1922 (via Istanbul), he emigrated with his wife to the United States. After three years at Johns Hopkins University, he joined the faculty of the University of Michigan, where he remained until his retirement in 1956. After his retirement as professor emeritus, he was in 1957 at Brown University as a member of the editorial staff of Mathematical Reviews and he was for several years a visiting professor at the University of Notre Dame. After the death of his wife in 1963, he returned to the University of Michigan at Ann Arbor and organized there a seminar on general relativity theory for physicists and mathematicians.

Rainich's research centered on general relativity and early work toward a unified field theory. In 1924, Rainich found a set of equivalent conditions for a Lorentzian manifold to admit an interpretation as an exact non-null electrovacuum solution in general relativity; these are now known as the Rainich conditions.

According to some sources, Peter Gabriel Bergmann brought Rainich's suggestion that algebraic topology (and knot theory in particular) should play a role in physics to the attention of John Archibald Wheeler, which shortly led to the Ph.D. thesis of Charles W. Misner. Another version of this tale replaces Bergmann with Hugh Everett, who was a fellow student of Misner at the time.

According to the Editor of The American Mathematical Monthly, Rainich is the inventor of the Rabinowitsch trick, a clever argument to deduce the Hilbert Nullstellensatz from an easier special case. It is later explained that Rainich was born Rabinowitsch, hence the Pseudonym.

Rainich, as Georg Rabinowitsch, proved new results on Euler's prime-generating polynomial.

Rainich was an Invited Speaker at the ICM in 1928 at Bologna (with talk On a Spacetime possessing the symmetry properties of radiation) and in 1932 at Zürich. He also gave a talk (concerning his results on the Euler prime-generating polynomial) at the ICM in 1912 at Cambridge, England. From 1933 to 1936 he was a member of the council (advising the board of trustees) of the American Mathematical Society.

Rainich's private papers are held at the University of Texas.

Personal life
In 1917 he married Sophie Kramkowsky. In 1930 he brought his mother from the Soviet Union to Ann Arbor, where she remained until her death in 1953. Upon his death he was survived by a daughter, two grandchildren, and a brother, Michael Rabinovich of Moscow.

Students

Several of Rainich's Ph.D. students became famous:

 Ruel Vance Churchill (12 December 1899 - 31 October 1987) is well known to several generations of mathematics students as a coauthor of a standard textbook known as "Churchill & Brown."
 Marjorie Lee Browne (9 September 1914 – 19 October 1979) was one of the first African-American woman to receive a doctoral degree in mathematics in the U.S.
 Wade Ellis (June 9, 1909November 20, 1989), mathematician and educator, and the twelfth African-American to receive a doctorate in mathematics in the U.S.
 "Tommy" Charles Brown Tompkins (1912 – 1971) was a mathematics professor at UCLA and a pioneer in numerical analysis and computing.

Selected articles

with Otto Laporte: 
with Herbert Boggs:

References

Citations

1886 births
1968 deaths
20th-century American physicists
20th-century Ukrainian physicists
University of Michigan faculty
Academics from Michigan
Scientists from Odesa
Ukrainian SSR emigrants to the United States